Thomas Jefferson: Author of America is a short biography of Thomas Jefferson, the third President of the United States (1801–09) and the principal author of the Declaration of Independence (1776), by author, journalist and literary critic Christopher Hitchens.

It was released as a part of HarperCollins' Eminent Lives series of "brief biographies by distinguished authors on canonical figures."

The book is dedicated to founder and retired CEO of C-SPAN, Brian Lamb: "For Brian Lamb, a great Virginian and a great American, a fine democrat as well as a good republican, who has striven for an educated electorate"

Reception

The book has been praised by critics.  Ted Widmer of The New York Times wrote, "Hitchens brings a refreshing perspective to the task, both in that he has not written at length about the founding moment and in that he sees Jefferson from the perspective of a Briton, albeit an Americanized one."  Publishers Weekly similarly described it as a "brief yet dense biography" and called it "a fascinating character study and an excellent review of early American history."  Kirkus Reviews called it "a lucid, gently critical view of the great president and empire-builder and most literate of politicians."

References

External links
Presentation by Hitchens on Thomas Jefferson: Author of America, June 17, 2005, C-SPAN 
Presentation by Hitchens on Thomas Jefferson: Author of America, May 6, 2006, C-SPAN

2005 non-fiction books
Books by Christopher Hitchens
American biographies
Biographies about politicians
Books about Thomas Jefferson
English-language books
HarperCollins books